The men's sprint cross-country skiing competition at the FIS Nordic World Ski Championships 2009 was held on 24 February 2009. The Sprint qualifying began at 11:35 CET with finals at 13:30 CET. The defending world champion was Norway's Jens Arne Svartedal, but he was eliminated in the quarterfinals at these championships. It was the first individual medal for all three finishers.

Results

Qualification

Quarterfinals
Q - Qualified for next round
PF - Photo Finish
LL - Lucky Loser - qualified for next round due to their times
Quarterfinal 1

Quarterfinal 2

Quarterfinal 3

Quarterfinal 4

Quarterfinal 5

Semifinals
Semifinal 1

Semifinal 2

Finals

 Final A

 Final B

References

External links
Qualification results
Final results

FIS Nordic World Ski Championships 2009